Ojai (Chumash: ’Awhaỳ) is a city in Ventura County, California. Located in the Ojai Valley, it is northwest of Los Angeles and east of Santa Barbara. The population was 7,637 at the 2020 census, up from 7,461 at the 2010 census.

Ojai is a tourism destination known for its boutique hotels, recreation opportunities, hiking, and farmers' market of local organic agriculture. It has small businesses specializing in local and ecologically friendly art, design, and home improvement. Chain stores are prohibited by city ordinance to encourage local small business development and keep the town unique.

The name Ojai is derived from the Mexican-era Rancho Ojai, which in turn took its name from the Ventureño Chumash word 'Awha'y, meaning "Moon". The city's self-styled nickname is "Shangri-La" referencing the natural environment of this health and spirituality-focused region as well as the mystical sanctuary of the 1937 film adaptation of James Hilton's novel Lost Horizon.

History

Chumash 
Ojai sits on the traditional territory of the Chumash, a Native American people who inhabited the central and southern coastal regions of California, in portions of what are Morro Bay in the north to Malibu in the south and the Channel Islands. Before the arrival of European settlers, at least 10,000 Chumash people lived in over 150 independent villages, speaking variations of the same language. Starting in 1769, Spanish soldiers and missionaries arrived to colonize the California coast, Christianize the native population, found military presidios and relocate Chumash people from their villages into Spanish missions.

Due to violence and imported disease, Chumash people died at devastating rates under Spanish rule. According to George Tinker, a Native Scholar, “The Native American population of coastal population was reduced by some 90 percent during seventy years under the sole proprietorship of Serra’s mission system.” Whether due to Spanish rule or as part of the California Genocide under the land's eventual control by the United States, by 1900, the Chumash population had declined to just 200, while current estimates of Chumash people today range from 2,000 to 5,000.

The name Ojai is derived from the Ventureño Chumash word ʼawha'y meaning "moon." A 1905 book on place names in the United States records the name Ojai as being derived from an Indigenous word meaning "nest", though the specific Indigenous language is not identified.

Rancho Ojai 

In 1837, Fernando Tico, a Santa Barbara businessman, received the 17,716-acre Rancho Ojai Mexican land grant, which included both the lower and upper Ojai valleys. Tico operated a cattle ranch on the land and moved his large family to an adobe in the lower valley. Tico sold the entire Rancho Ojai in 1853. The rancho changed hands several more times before it was purchased in 1864 by Thomas A. Scott, a Pennsylvania oil and railroad baron. The petroleum exploration of the Ojai Basin was the result of a report of oil seeps (oil springs) along the Sulphur Mountain area. In 1866, Scott's nephew Thomas Bard used a steam-powered cable-tool drilling rig on the north side of Sulphur Mountain. On May 29, 1867, Ojai No. 6 produced an oil gusher, at a depth of 550 feet, and the Ojai Field eventually produced 10-20 barrels of oil a day.  Also in 1866, Leland Stanford's brother Josiah dug oil tunnels on the south side of Sulphur Mountain, producing 20 barrels a day for the Stanford Brothers refinery in San Francisco. For economic reasons, falling oil prices at the end of the Civil War and cheaper imports from the east, Scott and Stanford ceased oil exploration in the valley area.  Thomas Bard then began selling the surface rights to parcels of Rancho Ojai in late 1867. As the president of Unocal, Bard would return in the 1890s to dig about 50 oil tunnels into Sulphur Mountain, which produced until 1998.

Nordhoff 
The town was laid out in 1874 by San Buenaventura businessman R.G. Surdam and named Nordhoff in honor of the writer Charles Nordhoff who had written a book about California titled, California for Health, Pleasure and Residence: A Book for Travelers and Settlers. Most early settlers to the valley had one or more family members who were ill, particularly with respiratory illnesses, and the Ojai Valley developed a reputation for having healthy air quality. Many did get well after moving to the valley. Charles Nordhoff had not visited the Ojai Valley when his book came out in 1873, but made several visits to his namesake town in the early 1880s, and he mentioned the Ojai Valley in the revised 1882 version of his popular book. The discovery of hot springs in Matilija Canyon and subsequent development of hot springs resorts in the late 1800s contributed to the valley's healing mystique.

The public high school in Ojai is Nordhoff High School. The public junior high school, named "Matilija", formerly served as Nordhoff Union High School and still features large tiles with the initials "NUHS" on the steps of the athletic field.

Railroad 
The Ventura and Ojai Valley Railroad connected Ojai to the national rail network near Ventura station in 1898. The Southern Pacific Railroad acquired all the capital stock in the Ventura and Ojai Valley Railroad in April 1898. The former rail line was converted to the Ojai Valley Trail in 1989.

Libbey 
Nordhoff became a popular wintering spot for wealthy Easterners and Midwesterners. The elite Foothills Hotel, which catered to them, was built on a mountain overlooking the town in 1903. Visitors enjoyed dining, music concerts, horseback riding, and hunting and fishing trips into the back country. Some of these businessmen built homes in the valley and contributed to the community's development. Among these winter visitors were Edward Drummond Libbey and his wife Florence. Their first winter in Ojai was in 1907. Libbey was the owner of the Libbey Glass Company of Toledo, Ohio. He fell in love with the valley, bought property in the Foothills tract in 1909, and built a Craftsman-style house designed by Myron Hunt and Elmer Grey.

Steeped in City Beautiful ideals, Libbey began thinking about what could be done to beautify the existing rustic town. He bought up all the properties on the south side of Ojai Avenue (where Libbey Park is today) and most of the buildings there were demolished. In 1916, he hired the architectural firm of Frank Mead and Richard Requa of San Diego to transform Nordhoff into the Spanish-style town center seen today. The project included a Mission-style arcade along the main street, a bell-tower reminiscent of the famous campanile of the Cathedral of the Virgin Mary of the Immaculate Conception in Havana, Cuba (also known as the Havana Cathedral), and a pergola with two arches opposite the arcade.

In March 1917, just after completion of the renovation project, the name of the town was changed to Ojai. The valley had always been known as "The Ojai". Leading up to and during World War I, American sentiment became increasingly anti-German. Across the United States, German and German-sounding place names were changed. Some Ojai writers in the past have speculated that anti-German sentiment contributed to the name change of Nordhoff to Ojai in 1917. There is no clear evidence that this was the case for the name change in Ojai.

To thank Libbey for his gifts to the town, the citizens proposed a celebration in the new Civic Center Park (later changed to Libbey Park) that they wished to call "Libbey Day," but Libbey suggested "Ojai Day" instead. The first Ojai Day took place April 7, 1917. Ojai Day was celebrated each year until 1928. Local schoolteacher Craig Walker revived Ojai Day in 1991 and it has been celebrated since. The Ojai Day celebration takes place in October.

In 1917 two fires struck the community. The first started in Matilija Canyon on June 16 and burned 60 buildings in its path, including many homes and the Foothills Hotel. The newly Spanish-style structures in the downtown were not affected. On November 28, 1917, a fire started in a gasoline stove in a store in the Arcade and the stores in the western half of the Arcade burned down. Part of the Arcade suffered smoke damage but did not burn down. A new Spanish-style Foothills Hotel was built in 1919–1920 to replace the one that burned down.

Housing 
The Taormina neighborhood was established as the first historic district in the city in 2016. The housing development was built in the style of French architecture of Normandy in the 1960s and 1970s by members of the Theosophy movement adjacent to the Krotona Institute of Theosophy. Taormina's founder, theosophist Ruth Wilson, envisioned the development as a retirement community for fellow theosophists but in the early 1980s a court ruling required the community to be open to residents of all faiths and backgrounds. The majority of homes in the city were built between 1940 and 1980 with about a dozen mobile-home parks included in the housing stock. With rapid growth in the 1970s, a slow-growth ordinance was passed. From 2008 to 2018, there were no new multifamily developments with a single six residential unit apartment being built in 2019.

Geography
Ojai is situated in a small east–west eponymous valley, north of Ventura and east of Santa Barbara. The Ojai Valley lies within the Topa Topa Mountains on the north and south and is actively shaped by a web of earthquake faults. The Santa Ynez Mountains lie to the north, while Sulphur Mountain and the lower Black Mountain lie to the south. The mountains to the west of the Ojai Valley are drained by the Coyote, Matilija and Santa Ana creeks. These empty into the Ventura River. The Matilija Dam, Casitas Dam and Lake Casitas Reservoir alter the historic drainage of these creeks and the river. The creeks that drain the mountains directly north of Ojai empty into San Antonio Creek, as does Lion Canyon Creek that lies between Black Mountain and Sulphur Mountain. San Antonio Creek drains into the Ventura River just north of Casitas Springs. The Ventura River flows through the Ventura River Valley and empties into the Pacific Ocean at the city of Ventura. The Ventura River was once known for its steelhead fishing before Matilija Dam and Lake Casitas were constructed, eliminating habitat for this trout species.

The eastern part of the Upper Ojai Valley is drained by the Sisar and Santa Paula creeks. These creeks flow into the Santa Clara River at Santa Paula. The high mountains above the Ojai Valley and further east are drained by Sespe Creek, which empties into the Santa Clara River at Fillmore. In 1991, 31.5 miles of the 55-mile-long Sespe Creek was given federal Wild & Scenic River status.

Sulphur Mountain creates the southern ranges bounding the Ojai Valley, a little under  in elevation. The Sulphur and Topatopa mountains are part of the Transverse Ranges system. The Ojai Valley and the surrounding mountains are heavily wooded with oak trees.

Climate
The climate of Ojai is Mediterranean, characterized by hot, dry summers, at times exceeding , and mild, rainy winters, with lows at night falling below freezing at times. During dry spells with continental air, morning temperatures, due to Ojai's valley location, can drop well below most of Southern California, with the record being  on January 6–7, 1913.

As is typical for much of coastal Southern California, most precipitation falls in the form of rain between the months of October and April, with intervening dry summers. During the wettest month on record of January 1969,  fell, with a whopping  in eight days from January 19 to January 26.

Demographics

2010
The 2010 United States Census reported that Ojai had a population of 7,461. The racial makeup of Ojai was 6,555 (87.9%) White, 42 (0.6%) African American, 47 (0.6%) Native American, 158 (2.1%) Asian, 1 (0.0%) Pacific Islander, 440 (5.9%) from other races, and 218 (2.9%) from two or more races. Hispanic or Latino of any race were 1,339 persons (17.9%).

The Census reported that 7,281 people (97.6% of the population) lived in households, 48 (0.6%) lived in non-institutionalized group quarters, and 132 (1.8%) were institutionalized.

There were 3,111 households, out of which 876 (28.2%) had children under the age of 18 living in them, 1,396 (44.9%) were opposite-sex married couples living together, 366 (11.8%) had a female householder with no husband present, 128 (4.1%) had a male householder with no wife present.  There were 151 (4.9%) unmarried opposite-sex partnerships, and 25 (0.8%) same-sex married couples or partnerships. 992 households (31.9%) were made up of individuals, and 496 (15.9%) had someone living alone who was 65 years of age or older. The average household size was 2.34.  There were 1,890 families (60.8% of all households); the average family size was 2.95.

The population distribution was spread out, with 1,520 people (20.4%) under the age of 18, 515 people (6.9%) aged 18 to 24, 1,446 people (19.4%) aged 25 to 44, 2,547 people (34.1%) aged 45 to 64, and 1,433 people (19.2%) who were 65 years of age or older.  The median age was 47.1 years. For every 100 females, there were 84.9 males.  For every 100 females age 18 and over, there were 79.9 males.

The homeowner vacancy rate was 1.7%; the rental vacancy rate was 5.4%.  4,243 people (56.9% of the population) lived in owner-occupied housing units and 3,038 people (40.7%) lived in rental housing units.

2000
As of the census of 2000, there were 7,862 people, 3,088 households, and 1,985 families residing in the city. The racial makeup of the city was 88.01% White, 0.60% African American, 0.50% Native American, 1.58% Asian, 0.17% Pacific Islander, 6.26% from other races, and 2.90% from two or more races. Hispanic or Latino of any race were 15.84% of the population.

There were 3,088 households, out of which 31.7% had children under the age of 18 living with them, 49.0% were married couples living together, 11.6% had a female householder with no husband present, and 35.7% were non-families. 29.0% of all households were made up of individuals, and 13.9% had someone living alone who was 65 years of age or older. The average household size was 2.48 and the average family size was 3.06.

In the city, the population was spread out, with 24.9% under the age of 18, 6.5% from 18 to 24, 23.9% from 25 to 44, 26.8% from 45 to 64, and 17.9% who were 65 years of age or older. The median age was 42 years. For every 100 females, there were 88.5 males. For every 100 females age 18 and over, there were 83.2 males.

The median income for households in the city was $44,593, and the median income for a family was $52,917. Males had a median income of $40,919 versus $30,821 for females. The per capita income for the city was $25,670. About 7.9% of families and 10.7% of the population were below the poverty line, including 15.9% of those under age 18 and 9.3% of those age 65 or over.

Economy

Ojai is a tourism destination known for its boutique hotels, recreation opportunities, hiking, and farmers' market of local organic agriculture. The 306-room Ojai Valley Inn, which opened in 1923, is situated on 220 acres with a golf course and tennis courts. There are just 12 hotels within city limits but short-term vacation rentals (STVR) were banned in 2016. A few accommodations are available in the surrounding unincorporated area where the county has placed similar restrictions on STVR. It has small businesses specializing in local and ecologically friendly art, design, and home improvement. Chain stores are prohibited by city ordinance to encourage local small business development and keep the town unique.

Cannabis

Under the legalization of the sale and distribution of cannabis in California, Ojai is one of two cities in the county that initially allowed retail sales. Voters approved a 3% tax on retail marijuana sales on 2020, which could eventually grow to a 10% tax. State law says local governments may not prohibit adults from growing, using or transporting marijuana for personal use but they can prohibit companies from growing, testing, and selling cannabis within their jurisdiction by licensing none or only some of these activities. The state requires cities to allow deliveries. By the end of 2018, three recreational marijuana storefronts were open in close proximity to each other. In 2020, there were two manufacturing businesses that were going through the permitting processes and the city was considering allowing on-site cannabis consumption.

Culture

Ojai's culture is heavily focused on ecology, health and organic agriculture, NIMBYism, walking/hiking, spirituality, music and local art. Weekends may include exhibiting classic cars or motorcycle clubs touring the area. On July 8, 1999, former Apollo astronaut Pete Conrad, one of the twelve men who walked on the moon, died of injuries suffered from a motorcycle accident in Ojai.

The Ojai Music Festival (founded in 1947) is an annual festival of performances by some of the world's top musicians and composers, and occurs on the first weekend after Memorial Day. Notable appearances include Igor Stravinsky, Aaron Copland, Esa-Pekka Salonen and Pierre Boulez, who was festival director in 2003. The outdoor bookshop Bart's Books, subject of news programs and documentaries, has been in Ojai since 1964. Ojai is home to the annual Ojai Playwrights Conference, a two-week playwrights festival that brings professional writers and actors from across the country to Ojai. The community is served by the Ojai Valley News, a weekly newspaper, the Ojai Valley Guide (formerly the Ojai Valley Visitors Guide) and the Ojai Quarterly, magazines published every three months.

In early June, often coinciding with the Music Festival, the Ojai Wine Festival is held at Lake Casitas. Over 3,000 wine lovers sample the products of more than 30 wineries. Proceeds go to charity.

Parks and recreation

The town of Ojai and the surrounding area is home to many recreational activities. Los Padres National Forest borders the town on the north, and many back country areas within the forest are accessible from Highway 33, the major north–south highway through town. Matilija Creek is a spot to enjoy splashing under waterfalls and backpacking. To the west, the Lake Casitas Recreation Area offers camping, picnicking, hiking, boating, fishing, and has a water park.

The valley has several public tennis courts in downtown Libbey Park. There are also two major golf courses: the Soule Park Golf Course, and the Ojai Valley Inn Golf Course. The town completed a new park, Cluff Vista Park, in 2002, which contains several small themed regions of California native plants, two water features, and three public art works. The park is located on a small hill which has a view of the mountains surrounding the town.

Sarzotti Park is a  city park that is home to the City of Ojai Recreation Center. The center was formerly the Boyd Clubhouse which was built in 1903 and located on the south side of Ojai Avenue east of Libbey Park. The Boyd Club was a men's athletic and activity club. The Boyd clubhouse was moved to Sarzotti Park in 1957. The city's recreational program offers soccer, softball, football, basketball, tennis, volleyball, exercise programs, and many other classes.

In April, the Ojai Tennis Tournament is held. It is the oldest tennis tournament west of the Mississippi River (founded in 1896) and has been an early competition for many players who went on to earn one or more Grand Slam titles. The Wall of Fame in Libbey Park honors players who competed and went on to win at least one Grand Slam. William Thacher (brother of Sherman Thacher) founded the Ojai Valley Tennis Club in 1895. There were five years when the tournament was not held: 1924 because of a hoof-and-mouth epidemic and from 1943 to 1946 during and just after World War II.

Ventura County parks in the area include Foster Park near Casitas Springs, Camp Comfort on Creek Road, Soule Park and Soule Park Golf Course, and Dennison Park on the Dennison Grade.

Annually, in early April, the town hosts a bicycle race that draws professional and amateur teams from around the country. The "Garrett Lemire Memorial Grand Prix" began in 2004 as a tribute to a 22-year-old cyclist from Ojai who died racing his bicycle in Arizona the previous year. The race is held on a  circuit that circumnavigates Libbey Bowl in the heart of downtown Ojai.

Public safety

Law enforcement
The Ventura County Sheriff's Office provides law enforcement services for the city. No homicides were recorded in 2015–2018.

Education

Public schools
 Ojai Unified School District
 Chaparral High School
Nordhoff High School
 Matilija Junior High School
 Meiners Oaks Elementary School
 Mira Monte Elementary School
 San Antonio School
 Summit Elementary School
 Topa Topa Elementary School

Other schools
The Ojai Valley is home to several private boarding schools:

 Besant Hill School of Happy Valley (formerly Happy Valley School)
 The Thacher School
 Ojai Valley School
 Villanova Preparatory School
 Oak Grove School
Weil Tennis Academy
 Monica Ros School (preschool through 3rd grade)
 The Ojai Valley is also home to: the Montessori School of Ojai, a private day school, Laurel Springs School, which specializes in distance education and home-schooling, Rock Tree Sky, a self-directed learning community in upper Ojai, Global Village School, a progressive K–12 homeschooling program, and Valley Oak Charter School, founded in 2003, is a K-12 WASC accredited, public charter, homeschooling hybrid
 Camp Ramah in California is in the hills of Ojai.
 The Summer Science Program was formerly hosted at the Besant Hill School (2000–2009) and at The Thacher School (1959–1999).

Media
The Ojai Valley News is a weekly, community-oriented newspaper that has been published since Oct. 27, 1891. The newspaper was called The Ojai until 1958. A newspaper called The Ojai Valley News was founded in competition to The Ojai in 1949. In 1958, J. Frank Knebel bought The Ojai, The Ojai Valley News and another small paper called The Oaks Gazette. He called this combined paper the Ojai Valley News and Oaks Gazette.  A competition newspaper called The Ojai Press was founded in 1959 and another called The Oaks Sentinel came out the following year. When both of these papers floundered a group of over 100 people called "Voice of the Valley" pitched in to take over these papers and began publishing the Press Sentinel. Members of the Voice of the Valley group felt strongly that there needed to be an alternative viewpoint in the valley from the views expressed in Knebel's paper. The Press Sentinel was published for two years. When Fred Volz purchased The Ojai Valley News and Oaks Gazette in 1962, changing the name to Ojai Valley News, the Press Sentinel ceased publication.

Infrastructure

Utilities
In 2013, a plan to take over the private water system was approved by voters. Up to $60 million in bonds would be issued and a special tax district would be formed. This was approved by almost 90 percent of voters but it was tied up in court by the private water purveyor, Golden State Water Company. Casitas Municipal Water District took over management of the Ojai water system by purchase of the franchise from Golden State Water Company in April 2017. The Ojai Valley Sanitary District treats the sewage from the city and surrounding areas. In 2020, the city banned new hook-ups to natural gas except for restaurants and pools.

Libraries
Public libraries: Ventura County Library—14 county locations, with three branches in the Ojai Valley:

 Ojai Library 
 Oak View Library
 Meiners Oaks Library

In popular culture

The title characters of the TV series The Bionic Woman and The Six Million Dollar Man (Jaime Sommers and Col. Steve Austin) are described in the series as having been childhood sweethearts in Ojai. In these series, a sign on the highway entering Ojai reads "Welcome to Ojai, home of American astronaut Steven Austin." Ojai was also mentioned in the Taylor Sheridan movie Wind River, while The Ojai Valley Inn & Spa was also featured in the movie The Two Jakes (Jack Nicholson and Harvey Keitel). Ojai served as the main location setting for the movie Easy A, starring Emma Stone.

Notable people 

 Bud Abbott, actor, producer, and comedian
 Beth Allen, professional golfer
 David Allen, author, Getting Things Done
 June Allyson, actress
 Colman Andrews, writer and editor
 Ethel Percy Andrus, founder of AARP
 Sergio Aragonés, cartoonist
 Daniel Ash, musician
 Alan Ball, film and television writer and producer
 Irene Bedard, actor, musician
 Ed Begley Jr., actor
 Max Bemis, comic book writer and lead singer of the band Say Anything
 Paul Bergmann, football player
 Elmer Bernstein, film and television composer
 Jon Bernthal, actor
 Bruce Botnick, engineer and producer for The Doors
 Ingrid Boulting, artist, actress
 Pierre Bouvier, singer of Simple Plan
 Eileen Brennan, actress
 Eric Burdon, singer-songwriter and actor
 Tim Burton, film director
 Rory Calhoun, actor
 Mario Calire, Grammy Award-winning drummer
 Julie Christensen, singer
 Julie Christie, Oscar-winning actress
 Cory Coffey, BMX rider
 Glenn Corbett, actor
 Michael Crooke, professor of strategy, consultant, former CEO Patagonia, Inc., former Navy SEAL
 Ted Danson, actor
 Anthony de Mello, spiritual leader
 John Diehl, director, actor in Stargate and The Shield
 Vernon Dvorak, meteorologist, Dvorak Technique for tropical cyclone analysis
 Dave England, Jackass star
 Peter Farrelly, film director, writer, and producer
 Maynard Ferguson, jazz musician, composer
 Joe Flanigan, actor
 Robben Ford, blues/jazz guitarist and vocalist
 Mark Frost, screenwriter and television writer
 Sharon Gabet, actress
 Lindy Goetz, music manager (Red Hot Chili Peppers)
 Larry Hagman, actor in I Dream of Jeannie and Dallas
 Anne Heche, actress, director, and screenwriter
 Otto and Vivika Heino, ceramic artists, "The Pottery"
 Toby Hemingway, actor in The Covenant and Feast of Love; moved to Ojai with his mother when he was 13
 Richard Jefferson, Australia-based molecular biologist, open source science advocate, founder of CAMBIA
 Mikael Jorgensen, keyboardist for Wilco
 Cody Kasch, actor and SAG award winner for Desperate Housewives
 Byron Katie, founder of The Work
 Roger Kellaway, jazz pianist and composer
 Linda Kelsey, actress in Lou Grant
 Ed Kowalczyk, lead singer for Live
 John Krasinski, actor
 Jiddu Krishnamurti, philosopher
 James Kyson Lee, Korean-American film actor, educated at Villanova Preparatory School
 Diane Ladd, actress, writer, director nominated three times each for Emmys and Oscars
 John Langley, creator of COPS
 Harry Lauter, character actor in film and television
 Zachary Levi, actor in Chuck and Less Than Perfect
 Ted Levine, actor in The Silence of the Lambs and TV's Monk
 Larry Linville, actor in M*A*S*H
 Jackie Lomax, musician, first artist signed to Apple Records, a label started by The Beatles
 Noah Lowry, former pitcher for the San Francisco Giants
 Johnny Mandel, composer and arranger of popular songs, film music and jazz
 S.A. Martinez, singer/rapper of the group 311
 Stacy Margolin (born 1959), tennis player
 Dave Mason, English musician, singer and songwriter
 Elisabeth Maurus (aka Lissie), folk-rock musician
 Orpheo McCord, drummer/percussionist for Edward Sharpe and the Magnetic Zeros
 Malcolm McDowell, actor
 Charles Millard Pratt, oil industrialist and philanthropist
 Rodney Mullen, skateboarder
 Bill Paxton, actor in Aliens and Apollo 13
 Paula Jean Myers-Pope, Olympic diver
 Caspar Poyck, actor, producer, chef, speaker and psychodigestive therapist
 Anthony Quinn, actor, painter, and writer
 Betsy Randle, actress, Boy Meets World
 Rick Rossovich, actor in Top Gun and Roxanne
 Louise Sandhaus, graphic designer
 Peter Scolari, actor in Newhart and Honey, I Shrunk the Kids: The TV Show
 Alex Sheshunoff, author
 Jan Smithers, actress in WKRP in Cincinnati
 Mary Steenburgen, actress
 Donna Steichen, Roman Catholic journalist and critic of feminism
 Izzy Stradlin, guitarist, formerly in rock group Guns N' Roses
 Peter Strauss, actor in The Jericho Mile and Rich Man, Poor Man
 George S. Stuart, sculptor
 Chuck Testa, taxidermist and subject of an internet meme
 Caroline Thompson, screenwriter and director
 Christopher Trumbo, screenwriter
 Rodney Walker, mid-century modern architect
 Beau Weaver, voice actor, narrator
 Reese Witherspoon, Oscar-winning actress and producer
 Beatrice Wood, artist, teacher at the Happy Valley School
 Dana Wynter, actress, Invasion of the Body Snatchers
 James Wysong, author 
 Loretta Young, actress and TV hostess
 Chloé Zhao, filmmaker and Oscar winning director,
 David Zucker, director of Airplane!, Top Secret!, and The Naked Gun
 Eugene Cole "Gene" Zubrinsky, Master Genealogist and Fellow of the American Society of Genealogists (FASG)

See also

References

External links

 
  Ojaihistory.com

 
Cities in Ventura County, California
Incorporated cities and towns in California
1921 establishments in California
Populated places established in 1921
History of Ventura County, California